The Benton House is a historic home located in Irvington, a historic neighborhood in Indianapolis, Indiana. Built in 1873, the home housed Allen R. Benton, a former president of Butler University in Irvington. It is a two-story, Second Empire style brick dwelling with a mansard roof.  It sits on a rugged stone foundation and features an entrance tower and ornate windows.

The Irvington Historic Landmarks Foundation was formed in 1966 to oversee the purchase and restoration of the Benton House. It now serves as a meeting place for the foundation and can be rented for private parties. All proceeds from events go toward the maintenance of the Benton House and future renovations. In 1973 the home was placed on the National Register of Historic Places.

The Benton House is also listed as an Indiana Museum. It is the only house on the Indianapolis East Side listed in the Historic Register that is available to the public.

References

External links

 

Individually listed contributing properties to historic districts on the National Register in Indiana
Houses on the National Register of Historic Places in Indiana
Second Empire architecture in Indiana
Houses completed in 1873
Museums in Indianapolis
Houses in Indianapolis
Historic house museums in Indiana
National Register of Historic Places in Indianapolis